Trackdown: Finding the Goodbar Killer is a television film starring George Segal, Shelley Hack and Tracy Pollan. It first aired on October 15, 1983, on the CBS television network. Produced by Sonny Grosso and Larry Jacobson, the film was directed by Bill Persky.

Plot
The film follows the investigation into the 1973 rape and murder of a young Manhattan school teacher. The film is a made-for-television sequel to the 1977 theatrical film Looking for Mr. Goodbar, which itself was based on Judith Rossner's acclaimed 1975 best-selling novel of the same name.  However, Trackdown opens with a disclaimer, disassociating itself from Rossner's novel.

Cast
 George Segal as John Grafton
 Shelley Hack as Logan Gay
 Alan North as Lieutenant Walter Belden
 Barton Heyman as Alan Cahill
 Tracy Pollan as Eileen Grafton
 Joe Spinell as Escobar
 Dick Latessa as Puliese
 Joe Lisi as Detective
 Richard Portnow as The Bartender

See also
 Looking for Mr. Goodbar (novel) by Judith Rossner
 Closing Time: The True Story of the Goodbar Murder

References

External links

1983 films
1983 television films
American television films
English-language television shows
Live action television shows based on films
Television shows based on American novels
Television shows set in New York City
American crime films
1980s English-language films
1980s American films